The VIZE 97 Prize (also The Vision 97 Award; in Czech: Cena Nadace Dagmar a Václava Havlových VIZE 97) is an international prize awarded to significant thinkers by the Dagmar and Václav Havel Foundation VIZE 97 (Nadace Dagmar a Václava Havlových VIZE 97). Starting in 1999, it has been awarded annually to people who through their work "cross the traditional framework of scientific knowledge, contribute to the understanding of science as an integral part of general culture, and in an unconventional way deal with the fundamental questions of knowledge, being and human existence." The prize is awarded in Prague, Czech Republic, and the laureates receive the "crosier of St. Adalbert of Prague."

Laureates

References

External links 
 
 Nadace Dagmar a Václava Havlových VIZE  at Google Cultural Institute

Czech awards
Philosophy awards
Awards established in 1999
1999 establishments in the Czech Republic